Albert Karnatz (1905 Detroit, Michigan – 15 July 1934 Detroit, Michigan) was an American racecar driver. A legend at his local track, he was killed there when he blew a tire.
 July 15 - Albert Karnatz, dirt track auto racer and employee of Chrysler Corporation, at age 29 after a crash at the Veterans of Foreign Wars Speedway in Detroit

Indy 500 results

References

Racing drivers who died while racing
Indianapolis 500 drivers
Sports deaths in Michigan
1905 births
1934 deaths
Racing drivers from Detroit